Platynus ovatulus is a species of ground beetle in the family Carabidae. It is found in North America.

References

 Bousquet, Yves, and André Larochelle (1993). "Catalogue of the Geadephaga (Coleoptera: Trachypachidae, Rhysodidae, Carabidae including Cicindelini) of America North of Mexico". Memoirs of the Entomological Society of Canada, no. 167, 397.
 Riley K, Browne R (2011). "Changes in ground beetle diversity and community composition in age structured forests (Coleoptera, Carabidae)". ZooKeys 147: 601–621.

Further reading

 Arnett, R. H. Jr., and M. C. Thomas. (eds.). (21 December 2000) American Beetles, Volume I: Archostemata, Myxophaga, Adephaga, Polyphaga: Staphyliniformia. CRC Press LLC, Boca Raton, Florida. 
 Arnett, Ross H. (2000). American Insects: A Handbook of the Insects of America North of Mexico. CRC Press.
 Richard E. White. (1983). Peterson Field Guides: Beetles. Houghton Mifflin Company.

Platynus
Beetles described in 1884